The Kakaako Pumping Station in Honolulu, Hawaii was designed by architect Oliver G. Traphagen in the Richardsonian Romanesque style. He also designed many such bold stone public works buildings in Duluth, Minnesota.

Built in 1900, the pumping station features large arched windows, exterior walls of local lava rock, roofs of green tile, and a smokestack 76 feet tall. It was the first sewerage pumping station in Honolulu, Hawaii, designed to address the serious sanitation problems of the rapidly growing city. It is located on an acre of land between the Kewalo Basin and Downtown Honolulu, at Ala Moana Boulevard and Keawe Street.

The Ala Moana Pumping Station took over its functions in 1940, and it has remained vacant for many years. Now under the jurisdiction of the Hawaii Community Development Authority, it is slowly being restored by the nonprofit Hawaii Architectural Foundation.

Oliver G. Traphagen also designed the "bright and airy" Moana Hotel on Waikiki Beach.

References

 Sandler, Rob, Julie Mehta, and Frank S. Haines (2008). Architecture in Hawai‘i: A Chronological Survey, new edition. Honolulu: Mutual Publishing.

External links
 

Sewage pumping stations
Buildings and structures in Honolulu
Industrial buildings and structures in Hawaii
Water supply pumping stations on the National Register of Historic Places
Industrial buildings and structures on the National Register of Historic Places in Hawaii
Infrastructure completed in 1900
Commercial buildings completed in 1900
Richardsonian Romanesque architecture in Hawaii
National Register of Historic Places in Honolulu
Sewerage infrastructure in the United States